The Hlučín-Darkovičky Czechoslovak Fortification Complex is an exhibition of 1930's military fortifications in Hlučín-Darkovičky, Czech Republic.

The forts MO S-18 "Obora", MO S-19 "Alej" and MO S-20 "Orel" are parts of the exhibition. They are part of a series of five different fortifications that were designed to sit on the Czech border during the first half of the 20th century. They are an important example of the defences availables during the World War II and the consequences of the Munich Agreement. The fortification complex has been under the management of the Silesian Museum in Opava since 1992.

See also
Hlučín Region
Czechoslovak border fortifications

References

Museums in the Moravian-Silesian Region
Military and war museums in the Czech Republic
Military of the Czech Republic
Forts in the Czech Republic
Opava District